Park Lane station may refer to:
Park Lane station (DART), a light rail station in Dallas, Texas, USA
Park Lane Interchange, a station on the Tyne and Wear Metro, Sunderland, England
Park Lane railway goods station, in Liverpool, England